Gavrakovo is a rural locality (a village) in Pertsevskoye Rural Settlement, Gryazovetsky District, Vologda Oblast, Russia. The population was 2 as of 2002.

Geography 
Gavrakovo is located 23 km southeast of Gryazovets (the district's administrative centre) by road. Volosatovo is the nearest rural locality.

References 

Rural localities in Gryazovetsky District